Regions and Powers: The Structure of International Security is a 2003 book by Barry Buzan and Ole Waever. The book discusses the Copenhagen School's approach to  sectoral security.

References
  

Copenhagen School (security studies)
2003 non-fiction books